is a Shinto shrine located in Kirishima, Kagoshima prefecture, Japan. One of the 2,861 shrines listed in the Engishiki, it is the first shrine in the historic Osumi Province. It is dedicated to Hoori, Toyotama-hime, Emperor Chūai, Emperor Ōjin and Empress Jingū. It is classified as a Beppyo shrine, according to the Association of Shinto Shrines. Historically it was also known by the names "Osumi Sho Hachimangu" and "Kokubu Hachimangu".

Enshrined Kami 
The kami enshrined are as follows:

 Main shrine

 Hoori: Amatsuhidakahiko Hohodemi no Mikoto (天津日高彦火火出見尊)
 Toyotama-hime (豊玉比売命)

 Subsidiary shrines

 Emperor Chuai (帯中比子尊)
 Empress Jingu (息長帯比売命) - Wife of Emperor Chuai.
 Emperor Ojin (品陀和気尊)
 Empress Nakatsu (中比売命) - Wife of Emperor Ojin.

History 
According to legend, the shrine was founded during the Age of the Gods, as Takachiho Palace, the residence of Hoori, during the reign of Emperor Jimmu. The shrine was relocated to its current location in 708. Sekitai Shrine is located on the original site. Takayanoyamano Mausoleum, said to be the mausoleum of Hoori, is located 13 km northwest of the shrine.

It is said that the God Hachiman was born in 544 at the former shrine site. This is the reason why the shrine was called Sho-Hachiman. According to legend, "Ohirume, the daughter of a great king of Chinas, was seven years old when the light of the morning sun pierced her breast. She conceived and gave birth to a prince. The king's retainers became suspicious, and put her on an empty ship, which they floated on the ocean, requesting that the place where the ship landed be given to them as their domain. The ship eventually arrived at the shore of Chinzei, Osumi in Japan, and the prince was named Hachiman. It is said that this was during the reign of Emperor Keitai. " The story goes on to say, "The prince arrived at the shore of Chinzei, Osumi in Japan. In "the Jinja Keiyo" written by Munei Shirai, the king is named "Great King Chen," and his daughter's name is also said to be named Hachiman.

It is written in the Konjaku Monogatarishu that Hachiman first appeared in Osumi Province, then moved to Usa, before finally leaving his mark at the Ishimizu shrine.

As the Chinese character for "Correct (正)" indicates, Kagoshima Shrine is said to be the most legitimate Hachiman Shrine. According to legend, there was once a dispute between Kagoshima Hachiman shrine (At the time known as Kokubu Hachiman shrine) and Usa Hachiman shrine over which was the more legitimate Hachiman shrine.  Usa Hachiman shrine secretly sent 15 (or even 14) messengers to burn down Kagoshima Hachiman shrine. As that happened, the character for "Shohachiman (正八幡)" appeared in the black smoke rising from the burning shrine. These messengers were so frightened that they fled to Mizobe, where they were punished by the gods and 13 died one after another. The local people then took pity on those who had died in a different land, and built mounds to comfort their souls at the places where they had fallen. These mounds are located in the northern part of the Kokubu Plain in Kagoshima Prefecture. The Jusanzukabara (Thirteen Mounds) Historic Site Park derives its name from this legend legend is located in the northeastern part of the area, near Kagoshima Airport. There are several other legends concerning the messenger of Usa Hachiman that differ in content from the above. There are several other legends concerning the Usa Hachiman emissary that differ in content from the above.

The first mention of the shrine in reliable historical records is in the Engishiki, compiled during the reign of Emperor Daigo, which lists it as an "Osumi Province Kuwabara-gun Kagoshima Shrine," making it the highest-ranking shrine in the called Southern Kyushu region of Hyuga, Osumi, and Satsuma. Because of its high prestige, the shrine produced a number of prominent priests from the Kuwabata and Saisho clans.

It is said that the God Hachiman himself was enshrined here during the Heian period (794-1185), when Usa Hachiman shrine invited the Hachiman Betsugu shrine of the Kyushu Gosho to go to Kagoshima Shrine. Since then, the shrine has also been called Sho-Hachimangu, Osumi Sho-Hachimangu, and Kokubu Hachimangu.

During the Kenkyu period (1190 - 1199), the shrine's territory was over 2,500 town hectares, and it held 1,000 koku until the end of the Edo period.

From the Sengoku Period to the Edo Period, the shrine was patronized by the Shimazu clan.

In 1871, the shrine was given a higher ranking under the Meiji government's modern shrine ranking system under the name "Kagoshima Shrine". This happened again in 1874, and once more in 1895 when it was promoted to a Grand Shrine. After the war, the shrine became a part of the Association of Shinto Shrines.

On November 19, 2021, the National Council for Cultural Affairs reported that the main shrine, the hall of worship, the imperial messenger hall, and the main shrine would be designated as Important Cultural Properties. The following year, February 9, 2022, this was reported in the official gazette and they were officially designated as Important Cultural Properties.

References

External links

 

Beppyo shrines
Shinto shrines in Kagoshima Prefecture
Kanpei-taisha